Maurice Mason (born 1948) is an Irish retired hurler who played for Kilkenny Championship club Ballyhale Shamrocks. He played for the Kilkenny senior hurling team for a brief period, during which time he usually lined out as a centre-back.

Honours

Ballyhale Shamrocks
All-Ireland Senior Club Hurling Championship (2): 1981, 1984
Leinster Senior Club Hurling Championship (3): 1978, 1980, 1983
Kilkenny Senior Hurling Championship (6): 1978, 1979, 1980, 1982, 1983, 1985
Kilkenny Intermediate Hurling Championship (1): 1974
Kilkenny Junior Hurling Championship (1): 1973

Kilkenny
All-Ireland Senior Hurling Championship (1): 1979
Leinster Senior Hurling Championship (1): 1979

References

1948 births
Living people
Ballyhale Shamrocks hurlers
Kilkenny inter-county hurlers